Rathaus Neukölln (Neukölln Town Hall) is a Berlin U-Bahn station located on the  line.

History
The station was built in 1926 by Alfred Grenander, and the platform extended in 1968. In 1989 a lift was installed, and the station became the first in Neukölln to be accessible to people with disabilities.

U7 (Berlin U-Bahn) stations
Buildings and structures in Neukölln
Railway stations in Germany opened in 1926